Varachha is a Suburb in Surat city and host of the Surat Diamond and embroidery Industry. The people of Saurashtra of Western Gujarat have moved away from their rain-starved native to Surat in search for income generation and survival almost four decades ago. Since then Saurashtrians have considered Surat as their home land.  After coming to Surat, some individuals began trading business while majority of them entered into labour front in a phased manner. The population of the people involved in diamond trade and embroidery market belonging to Saurashtra increased to a sizeable extent in Surat particularly in the area of Varachha.

Growth of Diamond Industry at Varachha

Varachha area is a major hub of diamond cutting and polishing. The major group working in this industry is people from the Saurashtra region of Gujarat. Because of demand in the American market from the early 1970s to the mid-1980s (with only a brief recession in 1979), Surat's diamond industry grew tremendously. Currently most of the diamond polishing workshops are running in the Varachha area of Surat, mostly by the people of the Patel community. Eight from ten diamond of world are polished in Surat city.

See also 
List of tourist attractions in Surat

References 

4. Surat varachha zone

Suburban area of Surat
Neighbourhoods in Surat